Lyaysan Rayanova (born February 1, 1989) is an alpine skier from Russia.  She competed for Russia at the 2010 Winter Olympics. Her best result was a 33rd in the slalom.

References

External links
 
 
 

1989 births
Living people
Russian female alpine skiers
Olympic alpine skiers of Russia
Alpine skiers at the 2010 Winter Olympics